Charles Richard Morris (29 August 1880 – 18 January 1952) was a professional footballer, who played for Derby County and Huddersfield Town as a full back. He also played international football for Wales on 27 occasions. He also represented Chirk and Wrexham in the Welsh league.

Family
He was born in Oswestry. His brothers, Jack and Robert, were also Wales internationals.

References

1880 births
1952 deaths
Welsh footballers
Wales international footballers
Sportspeople from Oswestry
Association football defenders
English Football League players
Chirk AAA F.C. players
Derby County F.C. players
Huddersfield Town A.F.C. players
Wrexham A.F.C. players
FA Cup Final players